Isekai Quartet is a Japanese anime series that serves as a chibi-style crossover between the light novel series KonoSuba, Overlord, Re:Zero − Starting Life in Another World, and The Saga of Tanya the Evil, all published by Kadokawa Corporation. The series is written and directed by Minoru Ashina, with character designs by Minoru Takehara, who also serves as chief animation director. The series is animated by Studio Puyukai. The main staff members returned to reprise their roles. The season includes guest appearances of characters from The Rising of the Shield Hero. Hino, Fukushima, Kobayashi and Yūki perform the second season's opening theme song , while Sumire Uesaka, Rie Takahashi, Inori Minase, and Saori Hayami perform the second season's ending theme song, . The second season ran for 12 episodes. Funimation has licensed the series for a simuldub. Crunchyroll is also streaming the second season. Muse Asia is streaming the second season in Southeast Asia.



Episode list

Notes

References

External links
  
 

2020 Japanese television seasons